The Chairman of the Oblast Soviet of Gorno-Badhakshan was the presiding officer of that legislature.

Sources
Various editions of The Europa World Year book

Political history of Tajikistan
Chairs of subnational legislatures